This is a list of books, films, and media associated with The Adventures of Tintin, the comics series by Belgian cartoonist Hergé.

Books 
The books can either be listed in the order in which the stories first appeared in newspapers or magazines (the "production order"), or in the order they were first published in album form ("publication order"). As many early stories were altered in the redrawings, and therefore chronologically fit in more with the later albums, both orders can be considered valid. Sometimes the redrawings introduced problems with the chronological order, one example is when Sheik Patrash Pasha presents a copy of Destination Moon in Cigars of the Pharaoh—Destination Moon was published almost 20 years after Cigars of the Pharaoh.

Production order 
 Tintin in the Land of the Soviets - (Tintin au pays des Soviets) (1929–1930)
 Tintin in the Congo - (Tintin au Congo) (1930–1931)
 Tintin in America - (Tintin en Amérique) (1931–1932)
 Cigars of the Pharaoh - (Les Cigares du Pharaon) (1932–1934)
 The Blue Lotus - (Le Lotus bleu) (1934–1935)
 The Broken Ear - (L'Oreille cassée) (1935–1937)
 The Black Island - (L'Ile noire) (1937–1938)
 King Ottokar's Sceptre - (Le Sceptre d'Ottokar) (1938–1939)
 The Crab with the Golden Claws - (Le Crabe aux pinces d'or) (1940–1941)
 The Shooting Star - (L'Etoile mystérieuse) (1941–1942)
 The Secret of the Unicorn - (Le Secret de la Licorne) (1942–1943)
 Red Rackham's Treasure - (Le Trésor de Rackam le Rouge) (1943)
 The Seven Crystal Balls - (Les Sept boules de cristal) (1943–1946)
 Prisoners of the Sun - (Le Temple du soleil) (1946–1948)
 Land of Black Gold - (Tintin au pays de l'or noir) (1948–1950) 1
 Destination Moon - (Objectif Lune) (1950–1953)
 Explorers on the Moon - (On a marché sur la Lune) (1950–1953)
 The Calculus Affair - (L'Affaire Tournesol) (1954–1956)
 The Red Sea Sharks - (Coke en stock) (1956–1958)
 Tintin in Tibet - (Tintin au Tibet) (1958–1959)
 The Castafiore Emerald - (Les Bijoux de la Castafiore) (1961–1962)
 Flight 714 to Sydney - (Vol 714 pour Sydney) (1966–1967)
 Tintin and the Picaros - (Tintin et les Picaros) (1975–1976)
 Tintin and Alph-Art - (Tintin et l'Alph-Art): Unfinished work, published posthumously in 1986, and republished with more material in 2004.

Publication order

Radio 
The BBC produced two series of Tintin radio dramatisations by Simon Eastwood. They were first broadcast on BBC Radio 5 in 1992 and 1993. The cast featured Richard Pearce as Tintin, Andrew Sachs as Snowy, Leo McKern as Captain Haddock (Lionel Jeffries in series 2), Stephen Moore as Professor Calculus and Charles Kay as Thomson and Thompson. The music was composed by Roger Limb. Both series were released on BBC Audio Cassette.

Series 1 
 The Black Island
 The Secret of the Unicorn
 Red Rackham's Treasure
 Destination Moon
 Explorers on the Moon
 Tintin in Tibet

Series 2 
 The Seven Crystal Balls
 Prisoners of the Sun
 The Calculus Affair (Part One)
 The Calculus Affair (Part Two)
 The Red Sea Sharks (Part One)
 The Red Sea Sharks (Part Two)

Special 
 The Castafiore Emerald (50-minute Christmas Special). It guest-starred Miriam Margolyes as Bianca Castafiore. It has not yet received a commercial release nor a repeat broadcast.

Television 
There have been two animated television series, based on the comic books.
 Hergé's Adventures of Tintin (1958–1962), was produced by Belvision (Belgium).
 The Adventures of Tintin (1991–1992), was produced by Ellipse (France), and Nelvana (Canada).

Cinema 
There have been a number of feature films featuring the characters, but not always based on original works by Hergé. There have been two live action films with actors cast for their resemblance to the characters.

Live action films:
Tintin and the Mystery of the Golden Fleece (Tintin et le mystère de la Toison d'or) (1961, live action, original story)
Tintin and the Blue Oranges (Tintin et les oranges bleues) (1964, live action, original story)

Animated films:
The Crab with the Golden Claws (Le Crabe aux pinces d'or) (1947, stop motion animation, adaptation)
The Adventures of Tintin: The Calculus Case (Les Aventures de Tintin: L'Affaire Tournesol) (1964, animation, adaptation)
Tintin and the Temple of the Sun (Tintin et le temple du Soleil) (1969, animation, adaptation)
Tintin and the Lake of Sharks (Tintin et le lac aux requins) (1972, animation, original story)
The Adventures of Tintin (2011) a motion capture film directed by Steven Spielberg and co-produced by Peter Jackson.
The Adventures of Tintin 2 (in development) a planned motion capture film directed by Peter Jackson and co-produced by Steven Spielberg.

Documentaries 
I, Tintin (Moi, Tintin) (1976, produced by Belevision Studios and Pierre films)
Tintin and I (Tintin et Moi) (2003, documentary about Hergé's struggle while creating Tintin in Tibet)
Sur le traces de Tintin (2010, documentary series)

Theatre 
 Tintin in India: The Mystery of the Blue Diamond (1941) — Hergé himself collaborated with humourist Jacques Van Melkebeke to write this play, which  covers much of the second half of Cigars of the Pharaoh, as Tintin attempts to rescue a stolen blue diamond. Performed at the Théâtre Royal des Galeries in Brussels.
 Mr. Boullock's Disappearance (1941–1942) — also co-written by Hergé and Van Melkebeke, the play has Tintin, Snowy, and Thomson and Thompson track the mysterious Mr. Boullock around the world and back to Brussels again. Performed at the Théâtre Royal des Galeries in Brussels.
 Tintin's Great American Adventure (1976–1977)  — based on Tintin in America; adapted by Geoffrey Case and directed by Tony Wredden; at the Arts Theatre, London, by the Unicorn Theatre Company.
  Tintin and the Black Island (1980–81) — based on The Black Island; adapted by Geoffrey Case and directed by Tony Wredden; at the Arts Theatre, London, by the Unicorn Theatre Company; later toured.
 Hergé's Adventures of Tintin (also known as Tintin the Show) (2005–2006) — musical version of Tintin in Tibet, at the Barbican Arts Centre, produced by the Young Vic theatre company in London. The production was directed by Rufus Norris and adapted by Norris and David Greig.  The show was successfully revived at the Playhouse Theatre in the West End of London before touring (2006–2007) to celebrate the centenary of Hergé's birth in 2007.

 Video games 

 Tintin on the Moon (1989)
 Tintin in Tibet (1996)
 Prisoners of the Sun (1997)
 Destination Adventure (2001)
 The Adventures of Tintin: The Secret of the Unicorn (2011)

Reprints and republications 
 In 1951 British weekly comic The Eagle ran "King Ottokar's Sceptre"
 In the 1960s and 1970s, various Tintin comics were reprinted in the American children's magazine Children's Digest.
 In 2000–2001, the short-lived magazine "Explore!" ran "The Black Island" and "King Ottokar's Sceptre"
 In 1982-90, the Indian fortnightly magazine "Anandamela" also ran 'The Adventures of Tintin' as 'Dyushahasi Tintin (দুঃসাহসী টিনটিন)'. They ran the 'Tintin in the Land of the Soviets' to  'Tintin and the Picaros'.

Other books 

 In 1983, Benoit Peeters published Le monde d'Hergé (later translated in English as Tintin and the World of Hergé), which chronicles the illustrated history of Belgian writer-artist Georges Remi (better known as Hergé), and his creation Tintin.
 In 1993, after the death of Hergé, his friend Frederic Tuten published Tintin in the New World: A Romance. More a thought experiment than a new adventure, Tintin here grows up: he is seduced and falls in love, has a dream about the death of Snowy and caring for an invalid Haddock, and critically examines his life and experiences.
 In 1988, a pirate comic/parody, The Adventures of Tintin: Breaking Free, was released, featuring Tintin as an unemployed youngster living with his uncle-by-marriage Haddock, who gets involved with the socialist/anarchists.
 In December 1999, a pirate comic book Tintin in Thailand came into circulation. The book, illustrated by Thai artists, presented Tintin, Haddock and Calculus on a sex holiday to Bangkok, with numerous allusions to the characters being unhappy with their treatment by the Hergé Foundation. In 2001, Belgian police made several arrests regarding the book in the Belgian town of Tournai.
 The Adventures of Tintin at Sea by Michael Farr (2004)  - a guide to the nautical-related scenes in canonical Tintin books
 Tintin: The Complete Companion by Michael Farr (2001)  - A descriptive guide on Hergé's influences and inspirations.

See also 
 List of books about Tintin
 List of films based on French-language comics
 Tintin coins
 Tintin postage stamps
 The Adventures of Tintin
 Tintin (magazine)
 Studios Hergé
 The Adventures of Tintin (TV series)

Notes 

Books, films, and media
Tintin